Magic Hat Brewing Company is a wholly owned brand of Florida Ice & Farm Co., which is headquartered in Costa Rica. It began production as an independent craft brewer in 1994, and is distributed across the United States. Their flagship beer, the apricot-tinged #9, is widely regarded as a significant early force in introducing many Americans to craft beer, especially in the late 1990s and early 2000s.

History
Magic Hat Brewing Company was formed in 1994 in Burlington, Vermont by serial entrepreneur Alan Newman and Bob Johnson, the company's original brewmaster. It expanded and moved to an industrial park in neighboring  South Burlington in 1997. By 2005 it had 64 employees. In 2008 the company purchased Pyramid Breweries, makers of the Pyramid and MacTarnahan's brands, expanding to 129 employees.

Acquisitions and eventual shutdown of Vermont space
In 2010, Alan Newman sold Magic Hat and all of its assets to North American Breweries. That company was established by New York City private equity company KPS Capital Partners. Newman described the purchasers as a company looking to "make money by stripping out expense and flipping." The new owners did exactly that - in December 2012, North American Breweries was purchased by Florida Ice & Farm Company (FIFCO), a Costa Rican food and beverages company. FIFCO soon began producing some Magic Hat beer at their Genesee Brewing Company plant in Rochester, New York, but the Vermont brewery continued to operate as well.

In June 2020, FIFCO announced that it intended to consolidate the rest of Magic Hat's brewing operations to the Rochester location. Another Burlington based brewery, Zero Gravity, assumed the lease on Magic Hat's physical plant, along with the brewing and retail assets within the space. 43 of Magic Hat's 46 Vermont employees were laid off, although Zero Gravity was in talks to rehire some of them. Zero Gravity moved into the space and began producing beer there in July 2020.

Brands

Magic Hat brews five year-round beers: #9 "Not Quite Pale Ale", Taken for Granite, Mother Lager, Citrus Box, Ob-La-Di, What's on Stage, Nirav, Elder Betty and Single Chair. It also produces up to four seasonal beers, seasonal variety packs and several limited release products.

References

External links

Company website

American beer brands
Beer_brewing_companies_based_in_New_York_(state)